Causonis trifolia commonly known as bush Grape, fox-grape, three-leaved wild vine or threeleaf cayratia  is a species of liana plant native to Australia and Asia. It has black-colored berries, and its leaves contain several flavonoids, such as cyanidin and delphinidin. Hydrocyanic acid is present in the stem, leaves and roots.

References

 
 
 
 

Plants described in 1753
Taxa named by Carl Linnaeus
trifolia
Flora of Queensland
Bushfood